Pentti Väänänen (12 February 1945 – 17 July 2020) was a Finnish politician and Master of Laws from the Social Democratic Party of Finland (SDP).

Career 
He was a Master of Laws. He worked in the Social Democratic Party of Finland as the secretary for international affairs between 1976 and 1983, and also as an advisor for Prime Minister Kalevi Sorsa from 1980 to 1983. 
In 1983 Väänänen was elected as the Secretary General of the Socialist International to succeed Bernt Carlsson, and served until 1989. 
Later he worked in the OSCE Parliamentary Assembly until 2004.

He is also the author of the book Purppuraruusu ja samettinyrkki (in Finnish).

Personal life 
On July 17, 2020, Väänänen died in his sleep with his wife by his side after battling cancer for a year.

References

1945 births
2020 deaths
Social Democratic Party of Finland politicians
Socialist International